The North Bellingham Cemetery and Oak Hill Cemetery are a pair of adjacent cemeteries in Bellingham, Massachusetts.  They are located on the north side of Hartford Avenue (Massachusetts Route 126) a short way east of its junction with Interstate 495.  The municipally-owned North Bellingham Cemetery is a roughly  plot, and is the oldest cemetery in the town, holding the graves of many of the town's founders.  Its earliest recorded burial was in 1712, and the last was in 1888.  Oak Hill Cemetery, a still-active cemetery, is a privately owned  parcel established in 1849.  The two cemeteries combine to show the full range of changing funerary tastes from colonial days to the present.

The cemeteries were listed on the National Register of Historic Places in 2012.

See also
 National Register of Historic Places listings in Norfolk County, Massachusetts

References

External links
 
 

Cemeteries on the National Register of Historic Places in Massachusetts
Cemeteries in Norfolk County, Massachusetts
National Register of Historic Places in Norfolk County, Massachusetts
Historic districts in Norfolk County, Massachusetts
Historic districts on the National Register of Historic Places in Massachusetts
Cemeteries established in the 18th century